The National Liberation Front (NLF) was a Marxist paramilitary organization and a political party operating in the Federation of South Arabia, (now southern Yemen) during the Aden Emergency.  During the North Yemen Civil War, fighting spilled over into South Yemen as the British attempted to establish an autonomous colony known as the Federation of South Arabia.  Following the exit of the British armed forces, the NLF seized power from its rival, the Arab nationalist Front for the Liberation of Occupied South Yemen (FLOSY). In the aftermath of the Emergency, the NLF reorganized itself into the Yemeni Socialist Party and established a single-party Marxist-Leninist government, known as the People's Democratic Republic of Yemen.

Background
In the late 50s Egyptian president Gamal Abdel Nasser's Pan-Arabism had spread to the region and threatened Britain and the traditional Emirs of the region's control.  In response the British were able to convince the feuding Emirs to merge into the Federation of South Arabia. In the federation the Aden Trade Union Congress had a large influence in the new assembly and to prevent it seizing control of the Federation in 1962 the Colony of Aden joined the Federation so that Aden's pro-British assembly members could counter the ATUC's influence.  The day after Aden joined the Federation Muhammad al-Badr of the Yemenese monarchy was overthrown and civil war ensued between forces backed by Nassar like the National Liberation Front (NLF) and monarchist forces backed by the Saudis and British.  This conflict spread throughout the region becoming what the British would term as the Aden Emergency which officially began when a state of emergency was declared in the State of Aden.

Creation
The anti-Royalist campaign for power spread to the Federation of South Arabia in 1964 when the NLF announced the start of their revolution.  In 1964 there was a new British government headed by the Labour Party after they won the United Kingdom general election.  They attempted to grant independence to the Federation of South Arabia by giving Abdullah al Asnag's FLOSY control of the country.  This proposal was annulled by the American President Johnson who didn't want Britain to withdraw while the Americans were escalating the Vietnam War.

In 1965 the British suspended the Federation of South Arabian government and imposed direct colonial rule.  Realizing that the British weren't going to give him control Asnag fled the country and joined the NLF.  However elements of the NLF become more radical Marxist and they split from the Egyptians.  Asnag formed his own military organization, FLOSY, in order to counter the NLF.  The NLF quickly denounced Asnag and FLOSY as Imperialist forces under control of Nasser and in addition to attacking the British also engaged FLOSY in combat.   By February 1967 the British could no longer control or protect its bases in Aden and announced it was leaving the country, against American wishes.

In January 1967, there were mass riots by NLF and FLOSY supporters in the old Arab quarter of Aden town, which continued until mid February, despite the intervention of British troops.  During the period there were many attacks on the troops, and an Aden Airways Douglas DC-3 plane was destroyed in the air with no survivors.  At the same time, the members of FLOSY and the NLF were also killing each other in large numbers.  On 20 June 1967, there was a mutiny in the Federation of South Arabia Army, which also spread to the police.  Order was restored by the British, mainly due to the efforts of the 1st Battalion Argyll and Sutherland Highlanders, under the command of Lt-Col. Colin Campbell Mitchell.

Nevertheless, deadly guerrilla attacks particularly by the NLF soon resumed against British forces.  Nasser threw its weight behind FLOSY and arrested the head of the NLF who was living at the time in Egypt.  Officially FLOSY and the NLF refused to talk to the leaving British forces as they didn't want to be seen associated with the British government.  However unofficial secret talks were held between the British and the NLF who conspired to defeat FLOSY so that the much hated Nasser supported FLOSY would be defeated.  With the British withdrawing from Aden by the end of November 1967, earlier than had been planned by British Prime Minister Harold Wilson and without an agreement on the succeeding governance.  When the last governor of Aden, Sir Humphrey Trevelyan, left the country he had no one to give the keys to but as a point of respect had the government house repainted for whoever emerged victorious.

Victory
On November 30, 1967 the Federation of South Arabia ceased to exist when the People's Republic of South Yemen was proclaimed.  In 1967 Israel defeated Egypt in the Six-Day War thus obliging Egypt to evacuate its troops from Yemen. FLOSY, now without any military support from its Egyptian ally, continued fighting the NLF.  However FLOSY's fate was sealed when the NLF managed to persuade the Yemen's Federal army to join the fight against FLOSY. On November 7, 1967 FLOSY tried to attack a federal army base but the army defeated FLOSY with the NLF's help, inflicting heavy losses on FLOSY.  After the defeat FLOSY´s fighting force disbanded although some cadres and leaders remained outside the country.  Most of the opposing leaders reconciled by 1968, in the aftermath of a final royalist siege of San'a'.

Post civil war
Qahtan Muhammad al-Shaabi held the presidency until 22 June 1969, when a hard-line Marxist group from within his own NLF seized control. Salim Rubai Ali (Salmin) replaced al-Shaabi as country leader.  After the civil war in 1970, Saudi Arabia recognized the Yemen Arab Republic and a ceasefire against remaining belligerents was put in place.  The NLF changed the name of South Yemen on 1 December 1970 to the People's Democratic Republic of Yemen (PDRY). The NLF changed its name to the Yemeni Socialist Party (YSP) in 1978.  All other political parties were amalgamated into the Yemeni Socialist Party (YSP), which became the only legal party.

Bibliography
Notes

References
 -Total pages: 224
 -Total pages: 83
 -Total pages: 1370
 -Total pages: 197
 -Total pages: 195
 -Total pages: 210

1963 establishments in the Federation of South Arabia
1978 disestablishments in Asia
20th-century disestablishments in Yemen
Aden Emergency
Arab nationalism in Yemen
Arab nationalist militant groups
Arab nationalist political parties
Communist parties in Yemen
Defunct political parties in Yemen
Federation of South Arabia
Independence movements
National liberation movements
Political parties disestablished in 1978
Political parties established in 1963
Popular fronts of communist states
Rebel groups in Yemen
Secessionist organizations in Asia
Separatism in Yemen
Wars involving the United Kingdom
Yemeni Socialist Party